Shelly Beach is a beach on Bate Bay in Cronulla, New South Wales, Australia. Shelly Park sits behind the beach. Shelly Pavilion is located between the beach and the park.

History
The name Shelly Beach is derived from the sea shells in the area.

Gallery

See also
 Beaches in Sydney
 Wanda Sand dunes

References

Geography of Sydney
Beaches of New South Wales
Cronulla, New South Wales